Hughes may refer to:

People 
 Hughes (surname)
 Hughes (given name)

Places

Antarctica
 Hughes Range (Antarctica), Ross Dependency
 Mount Hughes, Oates Land
 Hughes Basin, Oates Land
 Hughes Bay, Graham Land
 Hughes Bluff, Victoria Land
 Hughes Glacier, Victoria Land
 Hughes Island, Victoria Land
 Hughes Peninsula, Ellsworth Land
 Hughes Point, Ellsworth Land

Australia
 Division of Hughes, an electoral district
 Hughes, Australian Capital Territory, a suburb of Canberra
 Hughes, Northern Territory, a rural locality

United States
 Hughes, Alaska, a city
 Hughes, Arkansas, a city
 Hughes, Iowa, a ghost town
 Hughes, Wisconsin, a town
 Hughes County, Oklahoma
 Hughes County, South Dakota
 Hughes Lake (California)
 Hughes Mountain, Missouri
 Hughes River (Virginia)
 Hughes River (West Virginia)

Other
 Hughes, Santa Fe, Argentina, a town
 Hughes Range (British Columbia), Canada
 Hughes Reef, South China Sea
 1878 Hughes, an asteroid

Businesses 
 Hughes Aircraft Company, a former major American aerospace and defense contractor founded by Howard Hughes
 Hughes Electronics, created from a merger by General Motors 
 Hughes Communications, a provider of satellite-based communications services
 Hughes Dynamics, a wholly owned subsidiary of Hughes Tool in the computer services business in the early 1960s
 Hughes Helicopters, a major manufacturer of military and civil helicopters from the 1950s to the 1980s, initially part of Hughes Aircraft
 Hughes Network Systems, a wholly owned subsidiary of Hughes Communications
 Hughes Software Systems, established in New Delhi, India, in 1991, acquired by Flextronics in 2004
 Hughes Supply, a former wholesaler of construction supplies in the US and Canada, acquired by Home Depot in 2006
 Hughes Systique Corporation, an American provider of software R&D services
 Hughes Television Network, a defunct American television network
 Hughes Tool Company, purchased by Howard Hughes, Sr., later owned by his son Howard Hughes

Airports 
 Hughes Airport (Alaska)
 Hughes Airport (California)

In the military 
 , a World War II US Navy destroyer
 Fort Hughes, a former part of the harbor defenses of Manila and Subic Bays in the Philippines
 Hughes Airfield, Northern Territory, Australia, a Second World War airfield

In education 
 Hughes Hall, Cambridge, a constituent college of the University of Cambridge, informally called Hughes
 Hughes School District, Hughes, Arkansas
 Hughes High School (disambiguation), several US schools
 Hughes Middle School (disambiguation), several US schools
 Hughes School, near Hamilton, Ohio, on the National Register of Historic Places

Other uses 
 Hughes Medal, awarded by the Royal Society of London for an "original discovery in the physical sciences"
 Hughes baronets, two baronetcies, one in the Baronetage of Great Britain (extant) and one in the Baronetage of the United Kingdom (extinct)

See also 
 Hughes House (disambiguation), various US buildings 
 Hughes Manor, near Middletown, Ohio, on the National Register of Historic Places
 Hughes Stadium (disambiguation), several US stadiums
 Hughes Memorial Tower, Washington, DC, a radio tower
 Hughes breech-loading cannon, used by the Confederacy during the American Civil War
 Mr. Hughes (disambiguation)
 Hugh (disambiguation)